Alain Bordeleau (born 7 October 1956) is a Canadian long-distance runner. He competed in the marathon at the 1984 Summer Olympics.

References

1956 births
Living people
Athletes (track and field) at the 1984 Summer Olympics
Canadian male long-distance runners
Canadian male marathon runners
Olympic track and field athletes of Canada
People from Lachine, Quebec
Athletes from Montreal